= Tata Zambia =

- Company type: Subsidiary
- Industry: Automotive
- Founded: 1977
- Headquarters: Lusaka, Zambia
- Products: Automobiles; Engines
- Parent: Tata International Limited

Tata Zambia Limited is a car dealer and commercial vehicle manufacturer based in Lusaka, Zambia. It is a subsidiary of Tata International Limited.

== History ==
Founded in 1977, the company was the first Tata subsidiary on the African continent. Already in 1992, Tata Zambia was run as a bus manufacturer.

In 2006, a manufacturing plant for buses and trucks was set up in Ndola. Bicycles are also produced there.

As part of diversification, the company has been involved in Pamodzi Hotels since 1997.
